Radirgy Noa (also written as Radirgynoa) is a vertically scrolling shoot 'em up that was released in June 2009 for the Sega Naomi arcade platform by Milestone Inc. and the sequel to Radirgy. It was later released on February 25, 2010, in Japan for the Wii under the name Radirgy Noa Wii, distributed by LUCKY Co. LTD. It was also ported to the Xbox 360 on October 28, 2010, with new features, as Radirgy Noa Massive.  A Microsoft Windows version was released on February 25, 2011, as part of the Milestone Sound Collection.

Radirgy Noa features a cel-shaded graphical style very similar to that of its predecessor and 2-player co-op. Screen orientation is horizontal. Ruki Mishima, a redeemed villain of the first game, joins the cast as a player character.

References

External links
Official website

2009 video games
Arcade video games
Japan-exclusive video games
MileStone Inc. games
Science fiction video games
Scrolling shooters
Video games developed in Japan
Video games featuring female protagonists
Video games with cel-shaded animation
Wii games
Windows games
Xbox 360 games